Man Ki Jeet is a 1944 Indian Hindi-language film directed by W. Z. Ahmed. It is an adaptation of Thomas Hardy's 19th-century English novel Tess of the D’Urbervilles to an Indian setting.

References

External links
 

1944 films
1940s Hindi-language films
Indian romantic drama films
1944 romantic drama films
Indian black-and-white films
Films based on Tess of the d'Urbervilles